Vietnamese numismatic charms (Vietnamese: Bùa Việt Nam; Hán tự: 越南符銭; Chữ Nôm: 符越南), also known as Vietnamese amulets, Vietnamese talismans, or simply Vietnamese charms, refer to a family of cash coin-like and other numismatic inspired types of charms that like the Japanese and Korean variants are derived from Chinese numismatic charms (also referred to as Yansheng coins or huāqián), but have evolved around the customs of the Vietnamese culture although most of these charms resemble Vietnamese cash coins and the amulet coins of China. These "coins" were used at temples, as tokens within the imperial palace, and as everyday charms with supposed magical power such as having the ability to curse evil spirits and bogies. Some of these charms contained the inscriptions of real circulating cash coins but with added imagery.

Inscriptions on Vietnamese numismatic charms can be written in Chữ Hán, Taoist "magic" writing, Devanagari, pseudo-Devanagari, Chữ Nôm, and Latin scripts. Common inscriptions include Trường Mạng Phú Quý (長命富貴), Chính Đức Thông Bảo (正德通寶), and Châu Nguyên Thông Bảo (周元通寶).

Types of Vietnamese charms

Buddhist charms  
 

Like with Chinese numismatic Buddhist charms there are Vietnamese numismatic Buddhist charms that contain Sanskrit inscriptions, however some of these Buddhist amulets from Vietnam contain only Sanskrit syllables associated with certain sounds but without meaning, these meaningless inscriptions were presumably borrowed from Chinese monks who used them as religious iconography.

Vietnamese amulets with pseudo-Sanskrit inscriptions 

There are Vietnamese amulets that contain the Buddhist prayer "Om mani padme hum" (ॐ मणिपद्मे हूँ), or Án ma ni bát mê hồng (唵嘛呢叭咪吽), written in Devanagari script. This is chanting phrase used by Tibetan monks and has been adapted by other Buddhists in East Asia. In Buddhist schools of meditation the single syllable "Om" (ॐ) in this prayer is used as a focal point to help quiet the mind. These six syllables are said to purify the six realms. Many of these amulets have their inscriptions written in Devanagari is because many of the oldest Buddhist texts were written in Sanskrit later and Pali and many Chinese Buddhist monks studied Sanskrit to better understand these texts. Furthermore, Buddhist monks in Vietnam study Chinese languages to help understand these same texts. Thus there is a fusion of knowledge of both the Sanskrit and the Chinese language which influenced these amulets to both contain a form of pseudo-Devanagari and Chinese script.

Open-work charms 
 

During the 19th century, a two-sided open-work amulet with a two opposing dragons 
design within a circular frame. These open-work charms contain a number of Buddhist symbols and religious iconography such as the circular frame symbolising Wheel of Dharma (or Wheel of the Law), which encompasses all of the tenets of Buddhism. Another Buddhist symbol is an umbrella or canopy located on the top, as the umbrella in Buddhist symbolism is a sign of protection as it "shades all medicinal herbs", while the shade of the canopy is said to "protects all living beings". 

The design of two dragons are a part of Chinese folk religion, but like in contemporary Chinese and Vietnamese life, indigenous mythology mixed with Buddhism as can be demonstrated in several Buddhist charms which incorporate designs from other religions.

Vạn Thọ Thông Bảo  

During the 60th birthday of Revival Lê dynasty Emperor Lê Hiển Tông in 1774 a special Vạn Thọ Thông Bảo (萬夀通寶) amulet was cast, these charms were often used to commemorate the birthday of an emperor as had happened in the Qing dynasty with the 60th birthdays of Chinese emperors. The reason these charms are cast on this particular event is because 60 years symbolises a complete cycle of the 10 heavenly stems and the 12 earthly branches.

The Book of Changes and Bagua charms (Eight Trigram charms)  
 

Vietnamese Book of Changes and Bagua charms usually contain inscriptions displaying the Eight Trigrams (八卦, Bát Quái), these are the following Chinese characters: 乾, (☰, Càn) 坎, (☵, Khảm), 艮 (☶, Cấn), 震 (☳, Chấn), 巽 (☴, Tốn), 離 (☲, Ly), 坤 (☷, Khôn), and 兑 (☱, Đoài). 

In the case of these coins, "charm" in this context is a catchall term for coin-shaped items which were not official (or counterfeit) money. However, these numismatic objects were not all necessarily considered "magical" or "lucky", as some of these Chinese numismatic charms can be used as "mnemonic coins". 

These amulets may further have inscriptions like Trường Sinh Bảo Mạng (長生保命) which translates to "immortality" and "protect life". Such inscriptions would indicate that they were used as "protective" charms.

Zodiac charms  
 

The Chinese zodiacs appear on several Daoist amulets which were used for divination and fortune telling. Next to the image of each animal, the Chinese character for the animal is displayed.

Confucian charms  
 

Under the Nguyễn dynasty era Emperor Minh Mạng large (often 48 millimeters in diameter) presentation coins with the inscription Minh Mạng Thông Bảo (明命通寶) were made that featured inscriptions from the Huainanzi on their reverse, it is believed that this work was chosen because it states that a monarch or ruler should embrace both Confucianism and Taoism and attain sagehood. Because the term Minh Mạng (Hán tự: 明命) can also be translated as "bright life" or "intelligent decree" the inscription Minh Mạng Thông Bảo is commonly used on Vietnamese numismatic charms.

Lei Ting curse charms  
 

Vietnamese Lei Ting curse charms (or Lôi Đình curse charms) are numismatic charms that contain inscriptions to protect its wearer from evil spirits and ghosts. It was common for people to go to Taoist masters to ask for advice, and in Taoism secretive amulets are often used in ceremonies, while most of these amulets are made from paper. Vietnamese Lei Ting curse charms can have fortune telling symbols and Taoist "magical" incantations.

Vietnamese numismatic charms with cash coin inscriptions  

During the Vietnam war era Vietnamese numismatic charms with cash coin inscriptions were produced in large numbers as souvenirs for foreigners interested in antiques. In large South Vietnamsee cities like Saigon, Da Nang, and Huế, these charms usually sold for $1 or $2. They bore inscriptions of authentic Vietnamese cash coins like Quang Trung Thông Bảo (光中通寶), Gia Long Thông Bảo (嘉隆通寶), and Minh Mạng Thông Bảo (明命通寶), but many also contained fantasy inscriptions like Quang Trung Trọng Bảo (光中重寶), Hàm Nghi Trọng Bảo (咸宜重寶), and Khải Định Trọng Bảo (啓定重寶), the latter of which being based on the Khải Định Thông Bảo (啓定通寶). 

Some Vietnam war era replicas may include Hàm Nghi Thông Bảo (咸宜通寶) cash coins, which were produced under Emperor Hàm Nghi in the year 1885, without the reverse inscription "Lục Văn" (六文), or large (1 mạch) Duy Tân Thông Bảo (維新通寶) cash coins with the reverse inscription Trung Quốc Ái Dân (忠國愛民). The latter of these fakes are based on Minh Mạng Thông Bảo Thông Bảo (明命通寶), Thiệu Trị Thông Bảo (紹治通寶), and Tự Đức Thông Bảo (嗣德通寶) cash coins of 1 mạch which had this and similar reverse inscriptions, while in reality no similar large cash coins were ever produced before or after these three series.

Marriage charms  
 

Vietnamese marriage amulets often display dragon (龍) and phoenix (鳳) motifs, this is because the Vietnamese dragon is often used as a symbol for males, while the Phượng Hoàng (or "phoenix") is used to represent females. When the phoenix is shown together with the dragon this is often meant as a metaphor for the Emperor and Empress. 

Some marriage amulets have the obverse inscription Trường Mạng Phú Quý (長命富貴) written in seal script, which translates into English to "Long life, riches, and honour". This inscription symbolises good fortune in marriage as well as protection. There are also some Vietnamese marriage amulets with the inscription Thọ Sơn Phúc Hải (壽山福海, "longevity, 
mountain, happiness, and sea"), which is a part of a Chinese congratulatory phrase "May your age be as Mount Tai and your happiness as the Eastern Sea" (壽比南山福如東海). 

Some Vietnamese marriage amulets contain the Daoist Âm and Dương symbol (or Thái cực đồ), this is because in Daoist Âm symbolises the feminine and Dương symbolises the masculine. Further symbols may include the lotus flower, known as "荷" (Hà) or "蓮" (Sen). In Mandarin Chinese the word for "lotus" has a homonymous sound with the word which means "to bind" as in a marriage contract, "to love", and "to be modest". 

A design of Chinese, Korean, and Vietnamese marriage amulets display a pair of fish on one side and the inscription Ngư Song (魚双, "Pair of Fish") on the other side. In various Oriental cultures fish are associated with plenty and abundance. Fish are furthermore noted for their prolific ability to reproduce and that when they swim that this was in joy and are therefore associated with a happy and harmonious marriage. In Feng Shui, a pair of fish are associated with conjugal bliss and the joys of being in a matrimonial union. 

"Song of Unending Sorrow" charms, or "Song of Unending Regret" charms, are a common type of marriage coin charm, that might be Chinese, Japanese, Korean Taiwanese, or Vietnamese in origin, that depict part of the 9th century poem Chang hen ge written by Bai Juyi. "Song of Unending Sorrow" charms display four heterosexual couples having sex in various positions (or they are supposed to represent one couple having in four different positions) in the area surrounding the square centre hole of the coin. Surrounding the couples having sex are the Chinese characters representing the spring (春), wind (風), peaches (桃), and plums (李), which is a reference to the first four characters of a line from the Chang hen ge poem which translates into English as "Gone were the breezy spring days when the peach and plum trees were in bloom" in reference to the death of Yang Guifei.

Five poisons talismans  

The five poisons (五毒, Ngũ Độc), or the five noxious creatures, are an ancient Chinese concept that includes a snake, a centipede, a scorpion, a lizard, and a toad. Sometimes the five poisons may also include a spider. These numismatic amulets are a reflection of the taboo of the number 5. Traditionally the fifth day of the fifth month (which in the Chinese calendar falls in June), or "Double Five Day", is considered in traditional Chinese culture to be the day that causes the most illnesses because it's the hottest day. Because of this superstition the number five was also associated with illness. During "Double Five Day" these amulets displaying the five poisons were worn to ward off illnesses and evil. Because the Dragon Boat Festival occurs during this period, it is not uncommon for one of the five poisons to be replaced with a tiger representing the Warring States period person Khuất Nguyên. 

Some Five Poisons amulets contain the imperative command inscription Khu Tà Tîch Ác (驅邪辟惡) which could be translated as "Expel Demons and Wicked Sovereigns".

Vietnamese gong (khánh) shaped amulets  

Vietnam has been producing large brass gongs (khánh) shaped as bats for centuries, some Vietnamese amulets are modelled after this shape. While these amulets may also be found in China, they are produced in Vietnam and are one of the few uniquely categories of Vietnamese numismatic charms. These amulets are associated with wealth and good luck because of their shape bat shape, which is a homophonic puns in Mandarin Chinese, as the Mandarin Chinese word for "bat" (蝠, fú) sounds like "happiness" (福, fú).

The design of the bat shaped khánh also appears on a 1943 series 20 piastre banknote issued by the Banque de l'Indochine.

Plastic numismatic charms  

During the 20th and 21st centuries Vietnamese numismatic charms with Latin script made from plastics began being produced. The obverse inscription that appears on some of these amulets is "Thần Chúng Cho Ban" which translates to "May the Spirits Bestow Favours". While the reverse of these plastic amulets reads "Sa Cốc Miếu Ân" which translates to "The Temple Sounds Thanks", which could be a reference to when a monk receives a donation at a temple, they will often ring a bell in recognition of this fact.

List of Vietnamese numismatic charms by inscription

Notes

Catalogue numbers  

 Thierry = Amulettes de Chine et du Viet-Nam by François Thierry de Crussol (1987), in French. 

 Thierry-2002 = François Thierry, Catalogue des Monnaies Vietnamiennes - Supplément, Bibliothèque nationale de France, Paris (2002). 

 Greenbaum = Craig Greenbaum, Amulets of Vietnam. Houston (2004). 

 Grundmann = Amulette Chinas und seiner Nachbarländer by Horst Grundmann (2003), in German.

References

Sources

Further reading 

 Amulettes de Chine et du Viet-Nam, 1987 by François Thierry de Crussol (Academia.edu, in French)

Asian numismatic charms